Rolandas Jasevicius (born 31 July 1982) is a male boxer from Lithuania.

He participated in the 2004 Summer Olympics. There he was stopped in the first round of the welterweight (69 kg) division by Turkmenistan's Aliasker Bashirov.

Jasevicius won a bronze medal in the same division six months earlier, at the 2004 European Amateur Boxing Championships in Pula, Croatia.

External links
Yahoo! Sports
sports-reference

1982 births
Living people
Welterweight boxers
Boxers at the 2004 Summer Olympics
Olympic boxers of Lithuania
Sportspeople from Vilnius
Lithuanian male boxers